David Flitwick may refer to:

 David Flitwick (died 1353)
 David Flitwick (died 1296)